The Duke of Silesia was the sons and descendants of the Polish Duke Bolesław III Wrymouth.  In accordance with the last will and testament of Bolesław, upon his death his lands were divided into four or five hereditary provinces distributed among his sons, and a royal province of Kraków reserved for the eldest, who was to be High Duke of all Poland. This was known as the fragmentation of Poland. Subsequent developments lead to further splintering of the duchies.

At the beginning of the 14th century, fourteen independent Duchies existed in Silesia: Brzeg, Wrocław, Świdnica, Jawor, Ziębice, Głogów, Ścinawa, Żagan and Oleśnica in Lower Silesia; Koźle, Cieszyn, Bytom, Niemodlin, Opole, Strzelce, Racibórz and Opava in Upper Silesia and the ecclesiastical Duchy of Nysa. Between 1327 and 1329 most dukes accepted the overlordship of Bohemian king John of Bohemia, who acquired the right of succession for all of these duchies. In the coming centuries all branches of the Silesian Piasts died out, and with the death of George William, Duke of Liegnitz the dynasty ceased to exist.

Duchy of Silesia 

The Duchy of Silesia, one of the hereditary provinces of Poland, Silesia, was granted to Bolesław III's eldest son, Władysław II the Exile, and was subsequently divided among his sons Bolesław I the Tall (Wrocław/Lower Silesia), Mieszko I Tanglefoot (Racibórz/Upper Silesia) and Konrad Spindleshanks (Głogów). After Konrad's death Głogów was again united with the Duchy of Wrocław/Lower Silesia.

Dukes of Silesia

Piast Dynasty

Partitions of Silesia 

In 1173 Bolesław returned and he agreed to let Mieszko and Bolesław rule in their own Duchies, separated from the Duchy of Silesia. This led to the creation of the Duchy of Racibórz for Mieszko I and the Duchy of Opole for Jarosław, beginning the fragmentation of the Duchy of Silesia. The territories controlled by Mieszko I and Jarosław roughly corresponded to what is known as Upper Silesia, while the territories remaining with Bolesław I roughly corresponded to Lower Silesia.

Lower Silesia 

Duchy of Lower Silesia was a direct continuation of the Duchy of Silesia, but without the territories roughly corresponding to Upper Silesia; hence it was composed of the territories roughly corresponding to Lower Silesia. Some sources refer to it as the Duchy of Silesia; some as Duchy of Lower Silesia; others yet as the Duchy of Wrocław (Breslau). Wrocław was the capital of the Duchy of Silesia, yet this early (1172–1248) Duchy of Silesia should not be confused with the smaller Duchy of Wrocław that was created with further fragmentation in 1248.
The Duchy went through various border changes in the coming years, sometimes losing and sometimes gaining territory. In 1248 Lower Silesia was divided when Bolesław II had to cede the Duchy of Wrocław to his younger brother Henry III.

Upper Silesia 

Upper Silesia was divided into the Duchies of Cieszyn, and Opole-Racibórz. In 1340 the Duchy of Racibórz was united with Opava, a Bohemian fief.

Piast Dukes of Silesia

Partitions of Polish Silesia under Piast dynasty
      
Below follows a simplified table of Silesia's partitions:

A quick reminder avoiding confusion:

Table of rulers

Přemyslid Dukes of Silesia

Partitions of Bohemian Silesia under Přemyslid dynasty
      
Below follows a simplified table of Silesia's partitions:

Table of rulers

The Ecclesiastical Duchy of Nysa 
Established in 1290 by High Duke Henry IV Probus, held by the Bishops of Wrocław
 1302–1319 Henry of Wiebrzno
 1326–1341 Nankier
 1342–1376 Przecław of Pogarell
 1382–1417 Wenceslaus II of Legnica
 1417–1447 Konrad IV of Oleśnica
 1447–1456 Peter II Nowak
 1456–1467 Jošt of Rožmberk
 1468–1482 Rudolf of Rüdesheim
 1482–1506 Jan IV Roth
 1506–1520 Jan V Thurzo
 1520–1539 Jacob of Salza
 1539–1562 Balthazar of Promnitz
 1562–1574 Caspar of Logau
 1574–1585 Martin Gerstmann
 1585–1596 Andreas Jerin
 1596–1599 Bonaventura Hahn
 1599–1600 Paul Albert of Radolfzell
 1600–1608 Jan VI of Sitsch
 1608–1624 Charles of Austria, son of Charles II, Archduke of Austria
 1625–1655 Karol Ferdynand Vasa, Duke of Opole from 1648
 1656–1662 Leopold Wilhelm of Habsburg
 1663–1664 Charles Joseph of Habsburg, also Grand Master of the Teutonic Order from 1662
 1665–1671 Sebastian von Rostock
 1671–1682 Frederick of Hesse-Darmstadt
 1683–1732 Franz Ludwig von Pfalz-Neuburg
 1732–1747 Philipp Ludwig von Sinzendorf
Major part annexed by the Kingdom of Prussia after the First Silesian War in 1742.
 1747–1795 Philipp Gotthard von Schaffgotsch
 1795–1817 Joseph Christian Franz zu Hohenlohe-Waldenburg-Bartenstein
Prussian part secularised in 1810.
 1823–1832 Emanuel von Schimonsky
 1835–1840 Leopold von Sedlnitzky
 1843–1844 Joseph Knauer
 1845–1850 Melchior von Diepenbrock
Theocracy abolished in 1850.

See also 
List of Polish rulers
Piast dynasty
Dukes of Masovia
Dukes of Greater Poland
Dukes of Little Poland
Dukes of Cuiavia
Dukes of Sieradz-Łęczyca

References

Bibliography 
 Neue deutsche Biographie, Berlin 2001, Bd.: 20, p. 403–407
 Meyers Großes Konversations-Lexikon, Leipzig 1905–1909, Bd.: 17, p. 845–847

Sites 
http://www.tacitus.nu/historical-atlas/regents/poland/silesia.htm